Katy High School is a high school located in Katy, Texas which serves grades 9 through 12. It is a part of the Katy Independent School District. The school serves the City of Katy and the unincorporated Harris County community of Cimarron.

History
Katy High School opened in 1898 to serve the children of local rice farmers. Its first graduating class was in 1900.

Athletics

Softball- 
State Champions: 2015, 2019
 
Football
-State Championships:  1959 (1A), 1997 (5A), 2000 (5AD2), 2003 (5AD2), 2007 (5AD2), 2008 (5AD2), 2012–13 (5AD2),2015–16 (6AD2), 2020 (6AD2)

Notable alumni
 Rodney Anderson (2015)– NFL running back
 Ryder Anderson (2017)– NFL defensive end for the New York Giants
 Clint Black – country singer
 Andy Dalton (2006) – NFL quarterback for the New Orleans Saints as well as the Chicago Bears, Cincinnati Bengals and Dallas Cowboys
 John Dehlin – prominent Mormon podcaster
 Joel Dehlin – former Chief Information Officer for the LDS Church
 Jorge Diaz (1992) – NFL offensive tackle for the Tampa Bay Buccaneers and the Dallas Cowboys.
 Paddy Fisher (2016) – all-state LB and college football player at Northwestern Current AFL LB for the Michigan Panthers
 Terrence Frederick – NFL defensive back for the New Orleans Saints
 Eric Heitmann (1997) – NFL center
 Bo Levi Mitchell (2008) – quarterback for Eastern Washington University 2010 National Championship,  2011 Walter Payton Award winner – Current starting quarterback for the Hamilton Tiger-Cats, Grey Cup champion (2014, 2018), Grey Cup Most Valuable Player (2014, 2018)
 Ryan Mouton – NFL cornerback (2009-2013)
 Sage Northcutt – Professional MMA Fighter. Currently fights in ONE Championship.
 Mike Swick – retired professional Mixed Martial Artist, competed on the inaugural season of The Ultimate Fighter
 Renée Zellweger – actress
 Davis Cleveland – actor
 Keith Whittington- Class of 1986.  William Nelson Cromwell Professor of Politics at Princeton University.

References

External links
 

Educational institutions established in 1898
Public high schools in Fort Bend County, Texas
Katy, Texas
Katy Independent School District high schools
1898 establishments in Texas